Jana Marie Angelakis (born January 1, 1962) is an American fencer. Angelakis qualified for the 1980 U.S. Olympic team but did not compete due to the U.S. Olympic Committee's boycott of the 1980 Summer Olympics in Moscow, Russia. She was one of 461 athletes to receive a Congressional Gold Medal instead.  She did compete in the women's individual and team foil events at the 1984 Summer Olympics.

See also
List of Pennsylvania State University Olympians

References

External links
 

1962 births
Living people
American female foil fencers
Olympic fencers of the United States
Fencers at the 1984 Summer Olympics
Sportspeople from Lynn, Massachusetts
Pan American Games medalists in fencing
Pan American Games silver medalists for the United States
Congressional Gold Medal recipients
Fencers at the 1983 Pan American Games
21st-century American women